Vernadsky, Vernadskiy and Vernadskij may refer to:
 Vladimir Vernadsky, mineralogist and geochemist
 2809 Vernadskij, minor planet
 Vernadskiy (crater), lunar crater
 Vernadsky National Library of Ukraine
 Vernadsky Research Base, a Ukrainian Antarctic research station
 George Vernadsky, historian